John Baird (born 1 September 1790, died in Stirling, 8 September 1820) was a Scottish revolutionary.  A weaver by trade, he was brought up in the village of Condorrat.  He is best remembered as a radical commander in the "Radical War" of 1820, and along with James Wilson and Andrew Hardie is the best remembered radical combatant in the "Radical War".

Baird had a military career in the British Army, serving in the 2nd Battalion of the 95th Regiment of Foot (known as the Rifle Brigade) seeing military action in both Argentina and Spain.  His military experience meant that he was suitable to become commander of the Radicals in their doomed march to the Carron Ironworks.

He was sentenced to death and was executed outside Stirling Tolbooth on 8 September 1820 along with Hardie.  He is remembered as a martyr to the fight for universal suffrage by many figures in Scotland, particularly the 1820 Society.

References

1790 births
1820 deaths
Executed revolutionaries
Rifle Brigade soldiers
British Army personnel of the Napoleonic Wars
People from North Lanarkshire
19th-century Scottish people
Scottish soldiers
Scottish activists
Scottish people executed for treason against the United Kingdom
19th-century executions by the United Kingdom
1820 crimes in the United Kingdom